Suhi Vrh (Prekmurje Slovene: Süji Vrej) is a village northeast of  Moravske Toplice in the Prekmurje region of Slovenia.

The poet Ádám Farkas was born in Suhi Vrh.

References

External links
Suhi Vrh on Geopedia

Populated places in the Municipality of Moravske Toplice